Tetradenia riparia is a species of flowering plant native to southern Africa. It belongs in the mint and sage family Lamiaceae. It is occasionally referred to as misty plume bush and is commonly used as a decorative garden plant due to its flowers when in full bloom. Tetradenia means 'four glands' and riparia translates to 'growing on banks of rivers'. This species was first described by botanists (Hochst.) Codd in 1983. It is also known as ginger bush, Ibozane and musk bush.

Description
It is a shrub that grows up to 2m high, occasionally reaching 5m. The foliage is sticky and smells pleasantly aromatic. The plant is deciduous and multi-stemmed while the branches are semi-succulent. The leaves are simple, large, heart-shaped and opposite. They are also coarsely toothed, thick-haired and sticky, and are 35–80 mm long. Leaves that are crushed have a ginger scent. Both sides are covered with a thin dark red lint.

The inflorescences are branched, large bunches at the ends of the shoots. About three millimeters in diameter and would appear in veins, the flowers range in color from white to lilac, and pink flowers are also found. Male flower spikes have more of the "mist" effect than the female flowers which tend to be more compact. Flowering occurs only in subtropical or temperate climates in wintertime (June–August) when the plant is bare, in the top section of the branches, coinciding with the frost.

Range
It grows on the banks of rivers and hillsides. It is found in eastern South Africa in the provinces of KwaZulu-Natal, Mpumalanga and Limpopo, Namibia, Angola and Botswana and in eastern tropical Africa.

Cultivation
It is commonly planted in gardens as an ornamental because of its abundant decorative flowering. Fast growing (up to 80 cm per year), the plant will flower in its first year and would prefer occasional watering in summer, though less so in winter.

Medicinal
This shrub is considered a medicinal plant. The essential oil of its leaves feature antimalarial contents. It is one of Rwanda's most popular herbal remedies and has been used throughout its range to treat cough, malaria, diarrhea, dengue fever, headaches (inhaling the leaves scent), toothache and some other ailments. The herb used is fresh or dried leaves and young shoots. Herbs are usually collected as needed, as they tend to black out and dry poorly. Laboratory studies have shown that the herb contains ingredients that actually moderate the malaria-causing Plasmodium falciparum parasite. An extract from the leaves has been found to inhibit bacterial growth.

Gallery

References

External links

Lamiaceae
Garden plants of Southern Africa
Garden plants
Ornamental plants
Flora of South Africa
Flora of Angola
Flora of Namibia
Flora of Botswana
Garden plants of Africa
Plants described in 1983